Tyrhys Dolan (born 28 December 2001) is an English professional footballer who plays as a winger for Blackburn Rovers.

Career
Dolan initially joined the academy of Manchester City at the age of seven, but was released at the age of nine. He spent three years at Burnley before a return to Manchester City, who again released him at the age of fifteen.

He moved to Preston North End, before joining Clitheroe on loan in February 2020, making four appearances and scoring two goals. Dolan signed his first professional contract with Blackburn Rovers on 1 July 2020. Dolan made his professional debut with Blackburn Rovers in a 3–2 EFL Cup win over Doncaster Rovers on 29 August 2020. Dolan made his league debut in a 3–2 loss to Bournemouth.

International career
On 25 March 2022, Dolan made his England U20 debut in a 2–0 defeat to Poland in Bielsko-Biała. He scored his first goal for that age group four days later during a 3–1 victory over Germany in Colchester.

Personal life
Following the suicide of close friend Jeremy Wisten, who Dolan had met in the academy of Manchester City, Dolan told Blackburn Rovers that he wished to use his position to promote mental health awareness. He is an ambassador for the Go Again charity, who provide mental health support for sportspeople who are released from their clubs.

Career statistics

References

External links
 
 Rovers Profile

2001 births
Living people
Footballers from Manchester
English footballers
Association football midfielders
Manchester City F.C. players
Burnley F.C. players
Preston North End F.C. players
Clitheroe F.C. players
Blackburn Rovers F.C. players
English Football League players
Northern Premier League players